Lighting & Sound America is an American entertainment technology magazine published in New York City by PLASA Media Inc, a commercial arm of the Professional Lighting and Sound Association (PLASA). Lighting & Sound America covers the broad range of the entertainment, presentation and events industries worldwide, including theatre, live touring, clubs, themed venues, corporate events and presentations, as well as in-depth profiles of people and companies involved in the lighting and sound industry.

History 
Lighting & Sound America was launched in May 2004 in New York City, where it is still based now, under the editor-in-chief David Barbour, as a monthly magazine to the lighting and sound industries.

It is the sister magazine to Lighting & Sound International,  and has a page count of over 100 pages.

The magazine has collaborated with other large organisations within the industry on a number of different projects, such as the 2007 Staged Events Award and the 2005 InfoComm trade show in Las Vegas and has become a valuable resource for people working in the industry.

Circulation 
Lighting & Sound America is circulated to 12,000 subscribers each month, the vast majority of which are in North America.

References

External links 
 

2004 establishments in the United States
Monthly magazines published in the United States
Entertainment technology magazines
Magazines established in 2004
Magazines published in New York City
Lighting